The superior general of the Society of Jesus is the leader of the Society of Jesus, the Catholic religious order also known as the Jesuits. He is generally addressed as Father General. The position sometimes carries the nickname of the Black Pope, because of his responsibility for the largest male religious order, in contrast with the white garb of the pope. The thirty-first and current superior general is Fr Arturo Sosa, elected by the 36th General Congregation on 14 October 2016.

Titles

The formal title in Latin is Praepositus Generalis, which may fairly be rendered as "superior general" or even, "president general". The term is like that of military usage (and Ignatius of Loyola had a military background) which is derived from "general", as opposed to "particular". This usage is consistent with other Catholic religious orders, like the Dominicans' "master general", Franciscans' "minister general", Carthusians' "prior general", and with civil posts such as Postmaster General and Attorney General.  The Jesuits are organized into provinces, each with a provincial superior, (usually referred to as the "Father Provincial" or just "Provincial"), with the head of the order being the "general superior", for the whole organization. As a major superior, the Superior General is styled "Very Reverend".

Black Pope
"Black Pope" is an unofficial designation given to the position of Superior General of the Order of the Jesuits. The name follows from his leadership of the largest Catholic, male religious order and from the colour of the plain black cassock worn by members of the Society, including the Superior General. This may have originated from a past concern (most prominent around the 16th and 17th centuries) among Protestant European countries concerning the relative power of the Jesuits within the Roman Catholic Church, and partly because the Superior General, like the Pope, is elected for life.

Powers
The Superior General is invested with governing power over all the members of the Society, but customarily leads through Provincial superiors under him. Such power follows from the religious vows that bind members to community life, as in other religious orders.

Succession
Superiors General are elected by the General Congregation of the Society, summoned upon the resignation or death of an incumbent. Superiors General are elected for life and up to recently, as with the Popes, have served life terms. The exceptions being Father Pedro Arrupe (resigned for reasons of failing health) and both his successors, Father Peter Hans Kolvenbach and Father Adolfo Nicolás. On 2 October 2016, General Congregation 36 convened in Rome, convoked by Superior General Nicolás, and it elected Father Arturo Sosa as the thirty-first Superior General.

List of Superiors General
Until the 21st century, it was customary for Superiors General to rule for life. Where they left office before death, the date of death is listed below the date they left office. (Pedro Arrupe resigned in 1983 after a paralyzing stroke.)

Leadership during suppression

In 1773, the Jesuits were suppressed by Pope Clement XIV, through the Papal brief Dominus ac Redemptor on 21 July 1773, executed 16 August. The leaders of the order, in the nations where the Papal suppression order was not enforced, were known as temporary Vicars General.

The temporary Vicars General were:
 Stanislaus Czerniewicz (17 October 1782 – 21 October 1785)
 Gabriel Lenkiewicz (8 October 1785 – 21 October 1798)
 Franciszek Kareu (12 February 1799 – 7 March 1801)

On 7 March 1801, Pope Pius VII issued the brief Catholicae fidei, giving approval to the existence of the Society in Russia and allowing the Society there to elect a Superior General for Russia. This was the first step to the Society's eventual restoration.

The Superiors General in Russia were:
 Franciszek Kareu (7 March 1801 – 11 August 1802)
 Gabriel Gruber (22 October 1802 – 6 April 1805)
 Tadeusz Brzozowski (14 September 1805 – 7 August 1814)

The order was restored on 7 August 1814, by Pope Pius VII, through the papal bull Sollicitudo omnium ecclesiarum.

See also
 Admonitor (Jesuits)

Notes

References

External links
 The Goa Jesuit Province of the Society of Jesus
 New York Jesuit Province History Page on the Suppression

 
Society of Jesus, Superior General of the